The Riverton–Belvidere Bridge is a bridge crossing the Delaware River.  It connects Belvidere, New Jersey with Riverton, Pennsylvania.  

There is no toll for crossing on either side, after tolls were abolished by the Joint Commission for the Elimination of Toll Bridges in 1929. The bridge was first constructed in 1836, replacing the local ferry across the river. The board of freeholders in Warren County supported the replacement of the ferry with a bridge for safety of passengers. In 1832, the state created the Belvidere Delaware Bridge Company, which was funded with the job of building a bridge from Riverton to Belvidere. The new covered bridge was built by Solon Chapin, a contractor from Easton, Pennsylvania. The bridge survived two large storms in 1836 and 1841, although sustained major damage both times. In 1903, the floods that destroyed bridges along the Delaware River Valley, including taking out the entire covered structure at Riverton and Belvidere. They rebuilt the structure in 1904, using steel instead of wood, and the new span has remained since, with rehabilitations at certain points.

History

The first bridge (1836–1903) 

Original reports indicate that a ferry, operated by a doctor who went by "Dr. Belvidere", once ran along the alignment of the Riverton–Belvidere Bridge. This ferry, crossing one of the most dangerous parts of the Delaware, was reported to have opened as early as 1802. On May 17, 1825, the Board of Chosen Freeholders of the ferry permitted raising the rate to cross the river via ferry. However, by 1832, the ferry crossing was becoming dangerously busy, and required a bridge be constructed in its place. That year, the Belvidere Delaware Bridge Company was established by both the states of New Jersey and Pennsylvania. However, in constructing the bridge, the company was only allowed $20,000 (1832 USD) to construct the bridge. The bridge company had the designs for the bridge run by Solon Chapin, a contractor from Easton, Pennsylvania. Chapin was also the construction contractor on the nearby Riegelsville Bridge as well.

Although things seemed to start off smoothly, when construction began on the bridge in 1834, things went downhill. Within days of opening the bridge, on April 9, 1836, a storm blew through the valley, destroying two of the bridge's three piers and rendered the new bridge unusable. After restarting construction later, the bridge was redone using the same piers and in 1839, was completed and opened once again. However, in January 1841, another storm, dubbed the Bridges Freshet of January 1841, blew through the valley, destroying most of the bridges in the area, and causing major damage to the structure from Riverton to Belvidere. However, this time, the bridge survived the storm. A local historian stated that because of the constant repairwork on the bridge itself, the bridge company had never paid one dividend of money to its stockholders. Although, after society on both sides of the bridge began to live life with it, money started flowing into the accounts of the stockholders.

In 1903, the demise of wooden covered bridge would be seen, as a storm, dubbed the Pumpkin Flood of 1903, struck in October of that year. The storm struck both communities, and the bridge in between, causing the loss of many lives, and on October 17, the toll collector on the bridge closed off the gate and did not allow any person to cross. At 6:40 that evening, a crash was heard, and seconds later, the bridge was no more, after tumbling into the Delaware River below. Remnants of the bridge were swept downstream, and smashed on the side of the new Northampton Street Bridge, constructed just a few years before. After the storm cleared, the community of Belvidere put a ferry to Riverton back in almost immediately.

Construction of the current bridge (1904) 

After the 1903 destruction of the original wooden bridge at Belvidere, plans to construct another bridge started immediately. After the storm, the substructure of the crossing had survived the strong storm. The bridge corporation set a completion date, August 17, 1904, which was the day that the Farmer's Picnic was held in Belvidere. However, the contractor of which they hired to reconstruct the bridge, the New Jersey Bridge Company of Manasquan, New Jersey, believed that the new bridge would need new abutments and piers to be completed by that time, instead of using the old wooden bridge's piers. The three piers from the wooden bridge were used, and would require them to be heightened to be above any high flood waters. On June 3, 1904, the bridge construction began on a barge in the river, with promises to be complete by the set date of August 17. On August 17, the bridge was not complete, but usable, that when the Farmer's Picnic (the predecessor to the Warren County Fair, occurred, people were allowed to cross a majority of the bridge. The picnic itself was a complete success, attracting over 15,000 people, most of which walked the bridge.

Although the bridge was usable, work still had to be completed on the new bridge. The contractor promised the bridge corporation that the bridge would be finished by Labor Day of 1904, or September 5, 1904. The bridge corporation and a local group called The Red Men scheduled festivities and the official turnover of the bridge back to the corporation. On September 5, 1904, the day of the transfer, the chief executive of the contracting company, W.H. Keepers arrived, he found the bridge to be unacceptable. Bolts were missing in places of the bridge and paint was not completed, both of which were in violation of the contract. The festivities for the bridge were canceled, and visitors were disappointed. The Red Men held events, but the turnout was light. A high point of the events that day was done by a man named Murphy Jones, who as a stunt, jumped a  plunge into the Delaware River from the bridge. The festive stunt got Jones a total of $15 (1904 USD) and the event became an annual one. Work finally came to a conclusion in 1904, and the people were beginning to cross the new structure. However, since the turnover had never occurred, the bridge was free of charge.

The current bridge (1904–present) 
On September 5, 1904, the bridge finally got its transfer to the bridge corporation, and a new toll-taker was hired for the new bridge. After this, life went back to normal in both communities. In October 1928, after the charter and opening  of the Delaware River Joint Toll Bridge Commission, the bridge company was asked to sell the bridge to the commission for $60,000 (1928 USD), and on June 14, 1929, the commission abolished tolls along the bridge, making it free to cross at either end. With the bridge now under the control of the toll bridge commission, extensive repairs began on the 25-year-old structure. This construction included new beams for the bridge, new flooring, and an extensive repair to one bridge pier. Although the construction had only taken four months to complete, it still caused havoc in commuting across the structure. In 1940, the Pennsylvania approach to the bridge was designated as Pennsylvania Route 709, a designation that would last six years, being decommissioned in 1946.  The structure would face its most recent strength test in 1955, after the massive flooding from Hurricane Diane wreaked havoc in the area. The structure received minor damage in the flood, and the traffic was only halted for a day or two afterward. The design in the 1904 plan worked, as the structure was not at flood level.

Starting in October 2006, the Toll Bridge Commission began an $8.8. million rehabilitation of the structure. The rehabilitation helped extend the life of the bridge for years rather than shutting the bridge down constantly for the next 15 years for major repairs. The Commission replaced the flooring, repairing or replacing of certain steel portions of the bridge, blast-cleaning and repainted the structure.

See also 

 List of crossings of the Delaware River

References

External links 

Delaware River Joint Toll Bridge Commission
Belvidere, New Jersey
Bridges over the Delaware River
Truss bridges in the United States
Road bridges in Pennsylvania
Bridges completed in 1904
Bridges in Northampton County, Pennsylvania
Road bridges in New Jersey
Former toll bridges in New Jersey
Former toll bridges in Pennsylvania
Steel bridges in the United States
1904 establishments in New Jersey
1904 establishments in Pennsylvania
Interstate vehicle bridges in the United States